Cook Park is a multi-use venue in the suburb of St Marys in Sydney, Australia. It is mainly used for Association football and is the home ground for Nepean FC. The ground is also used by Western Sydney Wanderers FC's women's and youth teams. The stadium has a capacity of 1,000 people.

On 25 July 2012, the venue was host to Western Sydney Wanderers during the club's first match of any kind - a friendly against Nepean FC.

References

External links
Official website of Nepean FC
Soccerway page

Soccer venues in Sydney